XO-5 is a yellow dwarf main sequence star located approximately 910 light-years away from Earth in the Lynx constellation. It has a magnitude of about 12 and cannot be seen with the naked eye but is visible through a small telescope.

XO-5 has a suspected red dwarf companion with a temperature 3500 K, on a wide orbit.

Naming
The star XO-5 is named Absolutno. The name was selected in the NameExoWorlds campaign by the Czech Republic, during the 100th anniversary of the IAU. Absolutno is a fictional miraculous substance in the sci-fi novel Továrna na absolutno (The Factory for the Absolute).

Planetary system
The exoplanet XO-5b was discovered by the XO Telescope using the transit method in 2008. This planet is classified as a hot jupiter. A search for transit timing variations caused by additional planets was negative.

See also
 XO Telescope

Notes

References

External links
 

G-type main-sequence stars
Lynx (constellation)
Planetary transit variables
Planetary systems with one confirmed planet
Absolutno